Marlyon Rithe was an English politician in the 16th Century.

Rythe was born in Twickenham. He was a Lincoln's Inn lawyer and M.P. for Haslemere from 1584 to 1586. Rithe was buried at Twickenham on 30 May 1627.

References

People from Twickenham
1627 deaths
English MPs 1584–1585
Members of Lincoln's Inn